Rabina is a village, partly in the municipality of Nevesinje, Republika Srpska and for a part in the City of Mostar, Bosnia and Herzegovina.

Demographics 
According to the 2013 census, its population was 44, with 21 of them (all Bosniaks) living in the Mostar municipality.

References

Populated places in Nevesinje
Populated places in Mostar
Villages in Republika Srpska
Villages in the Federation of Bosnia and Herzegovina